The Rezazadeh Stadium is an all-seater indoor arena located in Ardabil, Iran. It was opened in 2007 and has a capacity of 6,000 people. The stadium is named after Olympic Gold medalist and world record weightlifter Hossein Rezazadeh.

Hosted events
2017 Asian Men's U23 Volleyball Championship
2018 FIVB Volleyball Men's World Championship AVC Qualification Final Round Pool A
2018 World Wrestling Clubs Cup – Men's Greco-Roman
2019 FIVB Volleyball Men's Nations League – Preliminary Round

Gallery

External links
Poushesh Gostar Engineering Group Profile

Indoor arenas in Iran
Sports venues in Iran
Buildings and structures in Ardabil
Sport in Ardabil Province